{{Infobox writer 
| name      = Donald Fixico
| image     = File:Donald L. Fixico (46953765844).jpg
| caption   = 
| birth_name   = 
| birth_date   = c. 1966
| birth_place  = 
| occupation   = Writer, intellectual
| nationality  = Sac & Fox Nation, American
| genre        = Native American intellectualism
| subject      =  
| movement     = Indigenous Nationalism
| notableworks = {{plainlist |
Termination and Relocation: Federal Indian Policy, 1945-1960
 Urban Indians, Rethinking American Indian History
 The Invasion of Indian Country in the Twentieth Century: Tribal Natural Resources and American Capitalism
 The Urban Indian Experience in America
 The American Indian Mind in a
Linear World and Daily Life of Native Americans in the Twentieth Century}}
| awards       = 
| website      = 
| imagesize = 
}}
Donald Fixico is a Native American American writer and intellectual. He is a Distinguished Foundation Professor of History at Arizona State University. Previously, he was the Thomas Bowlus Distinguished Professor of American Indian History, CLAS Scholar and the founding Director of the Center for Indigenous Nations Studies at the University of Kansas.

He is a policy historian and ethno-historian.

Background
Fixico is an enrolled member of the Sac & Fox Nation and descendant of the Shawnee, Muscogee, and Seminole people.

Education
Postdoctoral Fellowship, Newberry Library, Chicago, 1981-1982

Postdoctoral Fellowship, University of California-Los Angeles, 1980-1981

Ph.D. History, University of Oklahoma, 1980. Dissertation: “Termination and Relocation, Federal Indian Policy in the 1950s”

M.A. History, University of Oklahoma, Norman 1976. Thesis: “The Seminole Wars: A Study of Indian Nationalism”

B.A. History, University of Oklahoma, Norman 1974

Bacone Junior College, Muskogee, Oklahoma, 1969-1970 

 Career 
In 2000, President Bill Clinton appointed him to the advisory council of the National Endowment for the Humanities, and in 2002 he was the John Rhodes Visiting Professor of Public Policy in the Barrett, The Honors College at Arizona State University. In 2006, the Organization of American Historians awarded a short-term residency award to Fixico to give lectures for two weeks in Japan. Fixico has given lectures nationally and internationally and works with tribes and indigenous organizations. In 2012, he lectured at Sichuan University in China and University of Auckland in New Zealand in 2013. Fixico has been a visiting lecturer and visiting professor at University of California, Berkeley, UCLA, San Diego State University, and University of Michigan. He was an exchange professor at University of Nottingham, England and visiting professor in the  F. Kennedy Institute at the Free University of Berlin.

Works

Themes
Fixico writes most on the Native American experience and history, especially in oral history and the U.S. West.

He writes in depth and often about urbanization, particularly in conjunction with termination narratives and the American Indian diaspora. In his book Urban Indian Experience in America, Fixico discusses prior negative stereotypes about adjustment:This downtrodden image does not accurately portray urban Indians, particularly in the 1990s when at least three generations have survived the relocation years of the 1950s and 1960s. The early image misrepresents the urban Indian population to an unfortunate degree, since many Indian citizens in cities hold professional positions and are members of the middle class in America." (p. 27). Said of Fixico: Donald Fixico challenges scholars of American and Indian history to revise their thinking, enlarge their ‘seeing,’ and engage in an effort to understand Native people and their communities. He constructs a convincing argument about the uniqueness of Indian history and his explanation for seeing the world through Indian lenses leads Fixico to craft a terminology that makes a great deal of sense. — Margaret Connell Szasz, Regents Professor of Native American and Celtic History at the University of New Mexico and author of Scottish Highlanders and Native Americans: Indigenous Education in the Eighteenth-Century Atlantic World

 Books and contributions 
He has published a dozen books:  
 American Indians in a Modern World (2008)
 Treaties with American Indians: An Encyclopedia of Rights, Conflicts and Sovereignty, 3 volumes, ed, (2007)
 Daily Life of Native Americans in the Twentieth Century (2006)
 The American Indian Mind in a Linear World: American Indian Studies and Traditional Knowledge (2003)
 The Urban Indian Experience in America (2000)
 The Invasion of Indian Country in the Twentieth Century: Tribal Natural Resources and American Capitalism (1998), 2nd ed., 2011
 Rethinking American Indian History, ed. (1997)
 Urban Indians (1991); An Anthology of Western Great Lakes Indian History, ed. (1988)
 Termination and Relocation: Federal Indian Policy, 1945-1960 (1986)
 Call for Change: The Medicine Way of American Indian History, Ethos and Reality (June 2013)
 Indian Resilience and Rebuilding: Indigenous Nations in the Modern American West (October 2013).

He also has contributed to a number of publications, including "Removal of the Western Southeast Indians". Handbook of North American Indians: Southeast, Volume 14. U.S. Government Printing (2004); Witness of Change Over Fifty Years of Indian Activism and Tribal Politics. BEYOND RED POWER: TRIBAL POLITICS IN THE 1960S. School for Advanced Research Press (2007); The Federal Indian Relocation Programme of the 1950s and the Urbanization of Indian Identity. Removing Peoples: Forced Removal in the Modern World. Oxford University Press (2009);  The Literature of American Indian History. A Century of American Historiography. Bedford St. Martins Press(2009);  "From Tribal to Indian: American Indian Identity in the Twentieth Century". Native Diasporas: Indigenous Identities and Settler Colonialism in the Americas. University of Nebraska Press (2014).

Film 
Professor Fixico has worked on nearly 20 historical documentaries, including Texas Ranch House (2006), Freedom Riders (2009) and American Experience'' (1988).

See also
List of writers from peoples indigenous to the Americas
Native American Renaissance
Native American studies

References

External links and further reading
 

Interviews: Interview: Native Americans | American Experience | PBS

1966 births
20th-century American male writers
20th-century American short story writers
21st-century American comedians
21st-century American male writers
21st-century American short story writers
American male screenwriters
American male short story writers
Filmmakers from Arizona
Living people
Muscogee people
Native American filmmakers
Native American screenwriters
Native American short story writers
Sac and Fox people
Seminole people
American people of Shawnee descent